Alasgar may refer to:

Ələsgər, Azerbaijan, a village
Alasgar Alakbarov (1910–1963, Soviet actor
Alasgar bey Mahmudov (fl. 1918), Member of the Azerbaijani National Council
Shakili Alasgar (1866–1929), Azeri folk musician
Ashig Alasgar (1821–1926), Azeri troubadour
Leyla Mammadbeyova (1909–1989), Azeri aviator
Aygun Kazimova (born 1971), Azeri singer